Abdul Wahab Dar (born 9 November 1993) is a Pakistani cricketer. He made his first-class debut for Lahore Ravi in the 2012–13 Quaid-e-Azam Trophy on 31 January 2013.

References

External links
 

1993 births
Living people
Pakistani cricketers
Lahore Eagles cricketers
Lahore Ravi cricketers
Cricketers from Lahore